Asian house gecko may refer to:
 Hemidactylus frenatus
 Hemidactylus platyurus